The Barrau family is a French family from Aveyron. Its proven filiation dates back to Firmin Barrau, a public notary who made his will in 1557.

Origins
Barrau is a nickname coming from the word "barrel". This name is mentioned in some documents before the 16th century.

In the 17th century some members of the Barrau family claimed that they were noble, but in 1666 Guion de Barrau (1613–1703) was sentenced for "nobility usurpation". In 1699 he was admit as noble with the support of a forged genealogy that linked him to another noble family of the same name.

The genealogist Gustave Chaix d'Est-Ange wrote about this family : The nobility of the first members of this family is dubious : they didn't have any lordship and they didn't wear the title of squire. In 1666, Guyon de Barrau, from the village of Carcenac, was sentenced for "nobility usurpation".

notable members
Hippolyte de Barrau (1794-1863), co founder and first president in 1836 of the "Society of the Letters, Sciences and Arts of Aveyron".
 Eugène de Barrau (1801-1887), historian and vice-president of the Society of "the Letters, Sciences and Arts of Aveyron", founder of the legitimist newspaper Echo of Aveyron and member of the Legitimist movement in Aveyron. 
 Adolphe de Barrau (1803-1884), graduated from the school of medicine at the University of Montpellier, surgeon in the Royal Navy, member of the Society of Natural History of Montpellier, member of the Botanical Society of France and member of the "Society of the Letters, Sciences and Arts of Aveyron". In 1839 and 1840, as a naturalist and botanist, he was a member of a scientific commission of exploration of Algeria.
 Fernand de Barrau (1851-1938), lawyer, historian, agronomist, and a writer of the Journal of Aveyron newspaper. Catholic and royalist, member of the "Society of the Letters, Sciences and Arts of Aveyron" and member of the "Central Company of Agriculture of Aveyron".

References

Sources 
 Gustave Chaix d'Est-Ange, Dictionnaire des familles françaises anciennes ou notables à la fin du XIX siècle, 1904, tome 2, pages 361 à 362, Barrau de Carcenac (de)
 Jacques Ambroise de Bonald, Documents généalogiques sur des familles du Rouergue, Rodez, éd. E. Carrère, 1902, pages 63 à 66.
 Hippolyte de Barrau, Documents historiques et généalogiques sur les familles et les hommes remarquables du Rouergue dans les temps anciens et modernes, tome 4 (généalogie de la famille de Barrau, pages 95 à 109)
 Hippolyte de Barrau, History families of Rouergue
 Henry Bedel, Three historians of Barrau
 Dondin-Payre, Monique. Scientific Commission of exploration of Algeria: was an ignored heiress of the Commission of Egypt.

External links 
 Famille de Barrau (fr.Wikipedia)
 Books by Hippolyte de Barrau
 National Library of France. Book of Eugène de Barrau

Barrau